Verónica Zurita Castro (born 10 January 1974) is an Ecuadorian politician. She was the first female mayor of Santo Domingo, Ecuador.

Biography
Verónica Zurita was born in Santo Domingo, Ecuador on 10 January 1974. She also obtained a master's degree in business administration and a diploma in management in provincial government. Prior to entering politics, she was the manager of the Terrestrial Terminal in Santo Domingo and a professor at the UTE.

In 2002, Zurita was elected to the city council of Santo Domingo representing the Democratic Left Party. In 2004, Zurita resigned from her seat so as to stand for election for the Mayoral office of the city, but lost with 31% of the vote against , who successfully sought reelection.

Her mayoralty was characterized by the improvement of infrastructure and the providing of drinking water and improved plumbing for the city.

Citations

Living people
1974 births
PAIS Alliance politicians
Women mayors of places in Ecuador
21st-century Ecuadorian women politicians
21st-century Ecuadorian politicians